The Namib Desert dune ant, Camponotus detritus, is a large ant species distinguished by white and black symmetrical stripes and markings on its hairy abdomen. It is classified within the carpenter ant genus, a large group of more than 1,000 known species, many of which are associated with forested habitats in America and elsewhere. However C. detritus inhabits the hot dry dunes of the hyper-arid central Namib Desert in Southern Africa. Like many other ant species, it obtains its food and moisture by climbing the stalks of plants and drinking honeydew from scale insects, which themselves feed on shrubs and other perennial plants. It will also feed on dead insects. Nests are often lined with detritus - hence the binomial Latin name of the species. Each colony contains a single queen.

C. detritus is a diurnal species which uses its long legs to move at 5 mm above the surface, thus avoiding the highest temperatures which at noon in midsummer can reach .

The buckspoor spider Seothyra has been observed preying on these ants by hiding in the sand and grasping one limb of a passing ant, pinning it to the baking surface until it cooks to death, and then dragging it beneath the surface.

References

Camponotus
Insects described in 1886
Hymenoptera of Africa